The 2016 FC Edmonton season will be the club's sixth season of existence. The club will play in North American Soccer League, the second tier of the American soccer pyramid.

Roster

Staff
  Colin Miller – Head Coach
  Rod Proudfoot – General Manager
  Jeff Paulus – Assistant Coach
  Darren Woloshen – Goalkeeping Coach
  Andeas Morse – Team Administrator
  Jose Jimenez – Athletic Therapist
  Brandon Salter – Assistant Athletic Therapist
  Dr. Terry De Freitas – Team Physician

Transfers

Winter
Note: Flags indicate national team as has been defined under FIFA eligibility rules. Players may hold more than one non-FIFA nationality.

In:

Out:

Friendlies

Competitions

NASL Spring season

Standings

Results summary

Results by round

Matches

NASL Fall season

Standings

Results summary

Results by round

Matches

NASL Playoffs

Canadian Championship

Squad statistics

Appearances and goals

|-
|colspan="14"|Players who left FC Edmonton during the season:
|-

|}

Goal scorers

Disciplinary record

References

External links
 

FC Edmonton seasons
Edmonton
Edmonton